Football at the 1953 Maccabiah Games was held in several stadiums in Israel starting on 28 September.

The competition was open for men's teams only. Teams from 7 countries participated. The tournament was won by the defending champions, Israel.

As part of the closing ceremony, the host and winner, Israel, played an exhibition match against a selected team from the other competing nations. The match, that was played over two halves of 20 minutes, ended goalless.

Format
The seven teams were divided into two group, each team playing the others once. The top two qualified for the medals group, while the rest played for the 5th-7th places.

Preliminary round

Group A

Group B

Final round

5th-7th places group

Medals group

References

1953
Maccabiah Games